Víctor Manuel Castro (1924–2011) was a Mexican actor, screenwriter and film director.

Filmography
 Love for Sale (1951)
 The Unknown Mariachi (1953)
 Raffles (1958)
 Golden Legs (1958)
 Carnival Nights (1978)
 Midnight Dolls (1979)
 The Loving Ones (1979)
 The Pulque Tavern (1981)

References

Bibliography
 Charles Ramírez Berg. Cinema of Solitude: A Critical Study of Mexican Film, 1967-1983. University of Texas Press, 2010.

External links

1924 births
2011 deaths
Mexican screenwriters
Mexican male film actors
Writers from Mexico City
Male actors from Mexico City
Film directors from Mexico City